Epilucina californica is a species of small saltwater clams, marine bivalve molluscs in the genus Epilucina, found from central California to Baja California. Historical records claim that it lived from Crescent City to San Diego. The oldest known fossil record of this species is from the Miocene of Japan, indicating that it likely originated in the Eastern North Pacific and expanded before being restricted to its current range.

References

Marine molluscs of North America
Lucinidae